The 1998 UCLA Bruins football team represented the University of California, Los Angeles in the 1998 NCAA Division I-A football season.  They played their home games at the Rose Bowl in Pasadena, California and were coached by Bob Toledo. It was Toledo's third season as the UCLA head coach.  The Bruins finished 10–2 overall and were Pacific-10 Conference champions with an 8–0 record.  The Bruins played in the Rose Bowl on January 1, 1999, losing to the Wisconsin Badgers.  The team was ranked #8 in the final AP Poll and #8 in the final Coaches Poll.

Pre-season

Schedule

Rankings

Roster

Game summaries

Texas

Houston

Washington State

Arizona

Oregon

California

Stanford

Oregon State

Washington

USC 

Eight straight wins against the Trojans.

Miami (FL)

Wisconsin (Rose Bowl)

1999 NFL Draft
The following players were selected in the 1999 NFL Draft.

References

UCLA
UCLA Bruins football seasons
Pac-12 Conference football champion seasons
UCLA Bruins football